Palaemon carteri is a species of shrimp of the family Palaemonidae. It is endemic to the Amazon Jungle. It is one of the most common shrimp of the Amazon.

References

Palaemonidae
Crustaceans described in 1950